Chile participated at the 2018 Summer Youth Olympics in Buenos Aires, Argentina from 6 October to 18 October 2018.

Archery

Chile qualified one athlete.

Individual

Team

Athletics

Chile qualified five athletes.

Boys
Track and road events

Girls
Track and road events

Field events

Badminton

Chile qualified one player based on the Badminton Junior World Rankings.

Singles

Team

Beach volleyball

Chile qualified a boys' team based on their overall ranking from the South American Youth Tour.

 Boys' tournament - Vicente Droguett and Gaspar Lammel.

Boxing

Chile qualified one boxer based on their performance at the 2018 Youth American Confederation Boxing Championships.

 Boys' 91 kg - Andrews Salgado

Canoeing

Chile qualified three boats based on its performance at the 2018 World Qualification Event.

 Boys' C1 - Matías Reyes
 Girls' C1 - Isidora Arias
 Girls' K1 - Emily Valenzuela

Boys

Girls

Cycling

Chile qualified a boys' combined team based on its ranking in the Youth Olympic Games Junior Nation Rankings. They also qualified a mixed BMX racing team based on its ranking in the Youth Olympic Games BMX Junior Nation Rankings.

 Boys' combined team - Martín Vidaurre and Tomás Caulier.
 Mixed BMX racing team - Rocío Pizarro and Mauricio Molina.

Combined team

BMX racing

Futsal

Chile qualified a girls' team based on their performance at the 2017 Copa América Femenina de Futsal

 Girls' tournament - Tais Morgenstein, Javiera Salvo, Lissette Carrasco, Lorna Campos, Sonya Keefe, Carla Pérez, Muriel Jardúa, Romina Parraguez, Grace Mora y Daniela Aguirre.

Summary

Group D

Karate

Chile qualified one athlete.

 Girls' -53 kg - Catalina Valdés

Roller speed skating

Chile qualified two roller skaters based on its performance at the 2018 Roller Speed Skating World Championship.

 Boys' combined speed event - Ignacio Mardones Vidal
 Girls' combined speed event - Ashly Marin Torres

Rowing

Chile qualified two boats based on its performance at the American Qualification Regatta.

 Boys' pairs - José Obando and Nicolás Tapia.
 Girls' pairs - Isidora Niemeyer and Christina Hostetter.

Shooting

Chile qualified one sport shooter based on its performance at the American Qualification Tournament.

 Girls' 10m Air Rifle - Isidora Van De Perre

Individual

Mixed

Sport climbing

Chile qualified one sport climber based on its performance at the 2017 Pan American Youth Sport Climbing Championships.

 Girls' combined - 1 quota (Alejandra Contreras)

Swimming

Chile qualified four athletes.

Boys

Girls

Mixed

Table tennis

Chile qualified one table tennis player based on its performance at the Latin American Continental Qualifier.

 Boys' singles - Nicolas Burgos
Singles

Team

Triathlon

Chile qualified one athlete based on its performance at the 2018 American Youth Olympic Games Qualifier.

 Boys' individual - Cristóbal Baeza
Individual

Relay

Weightlifting

Chile qualified two athletes.

 Boys' 85 kg - Nicolás Cuevas
 Girls' 58 kg - Yerika Ríos
Boy

Girl

References

2018 in Chilean sport
Nations at the 2018 Summer Youth Olympics
Chile at the Youth Olympics